Robert Brown (December 25, 1744 – February 26, 1823) was a United States representative from Pennsylvania. Brown was born in Weaversville in East Allen Township, Pennsylvania, he attended the common schools and was apprenticed to the blacksmith trade.

American Revolutionary War
At the beginning of the American Revolutionary War, he was commissioned first lieutenant in the Pennsylvania "Flying Camp". On September 10, 1776; he was captured at the surrender of Fort Washington on November 16, 1776 and worked at the blacksmith trade while a prisoner. He was later put aboard the prison ship Judith and was subsequently imprisoned in New York City's Old City Hall. He was paroled on board ship December 10, 1777.

Pennsylvania Senate and Congress
Brown was a member of the Pennsylvania State Senate from 1783 to 1787, and was elected as a Democratic-Republican to the Fifth Congress to fill the vacancy caused by the resignation of Samuel Sitgreaves. He was reelected to the Sixth and to seven succeeding Congresses, serving from December 4, 1798 to March 3, 1815. He was not a candidate for renomination in 1814, and retired from public life and lived on his farm.

Death
In 1823, Brown died near Weaversville. He is buried in Horner's Cemetery located beside Northampton God's Missionary Church in East Allen Township in Northampton County, Pennsylvania.

References

1744 births
1823 deaths
American Revolutionary War prisoners of war held by Great Britain
Continental Army officers from Pennsylvania
Democratic-Republican Party members of the United States House of Representatives from Pennsylvania
Pennsylvania state senators
Politicians from Northampton County, Pennsylvania